Dominique Provost-Chalkley (born 24 March 1990) is a British-Canadian actor, best known for their role as Waverly Earp on the television series Wynonna Earp.

Career
They began dancing at the age of four and, at the age of 16, began training as an actor and singer at the Laine Theatre Arts School.

Provost-Chalkley began appearing on television in 2008 as a dancer in the ITV series Britannia High. In 2010, they were an alternate in the West End hit musical Dirty Dancing. In 2012, they starred as Vanya in the British thriller film The Seasoning House and were featured in an episode of the E4's sitcom The Midnight Beast. In 2015, they played Zrinka in the Hollywood blockbuster film Avengers: Age of Ultron.

On stage, they played Holly in Viva Forever!, a jukebox musical about the Spice Girls that took place in West End from 2012 to 2013.

In 2016, they began playing Waverly Earp on the Canadian-American television series Wynonna Earp, a performance for which they received considerable fan attention; they have been noted for their performance of a queer character by the LGBT community. They originally auditioned for the lead role. In 2018, they, along with the cast of Wynonna Earp, received the People's Choice Award for best Sci-Fi show. The show won as a write-in candidate due to the show's fandom known as "Earpers". They have also played a variety of guest roles in other television series, including on Murdoch Mysteries (2016) and 12 Monkeys (2017)

In 2017, they played a supporting role in The Carmilla Movie, a feature film based on the popular web series of the same name.

In 2019, they played the role of Sue in the queer holiday movie, Season of Love, where they performed a Billy Steinberg song, "Lift Your Spirit Up".

Wrote songs "Pride Liberates"  and "Keeping Me Safe"  which are sung by singer/song writer and friend, Emy Taliana. Both songs can be heard on Emy Taliana's album, "Everything Is Love."

Personal life
Child of Danielle Provost and Christopher Chalkley, an artist and activist, manager, founder and president of the People's Republic of Stokes Croft (PRSC), a collective that aims to enhance the neighborhood with art and local artists.
Provost-Chalkley was born in Bristol, England. They are also Canadian, due to their Quebecois mother.

Provost-Chalkley came out, stating "I am queer. I am into ALL humans", on 24 March 2020, their 30th birthday, through an initiative called "Rainbow Waves" spawned from their organisation Start The Wave.

They are also the founder of “Start the Wave”, a non-profit organization.
They have Raynaud syndrome and dyslexia.

In 2021, they came out as non-binary and genderfluid. They use they/them pronouns.

Work

Film

Television

Stage

Awards

References

External links
 

1990 births
Living people
English film actors
English television actors
English people of Québécois descent
Queer actors
English LGBT actors
British non-binary actors
Non-binary musicians
Non-binary activists
21st-century Canadian LGBT people
Canadian LGBT actors
Canadian non-binary actors